G70 may refer to:

 GeForce 7 series, a graphics processing unit
 G70 Fuzhou–Yinchuan Expressway, a road in China
 HMAS Queenborough (G70), a ship
 Genesis G70, a car
 designation of 7th generation BMW 7 Series